The bush tyrants are found in the following places:
 in the genus Myiotheretes
 Red-rumped bush tyrant, 	Cnemarchus erythropygius
 Rufous-webbed bush tyrant,  Polioxolmis rufipennis

Birds by common name